Diego Enrique Bustamante Gutiérrez (born 21 February 1983) is a Peruvian footballer who plays as a midfielder. He currently plays for León de Huánuco in the Peruvian First Division.

Honours

Club
Universitario de Deportes:
Peruvian First Division: 2009

References

External links
 
 

1983 births
Living people
Footballers from Lima
Peruvian footballers
Association football midfielders
Sport Boys footballers
Club Deportivo Universidad de San Martín de Porres players
FBC Melgar footballers
Alianza Atlético footballers
Club Universitario de Deportes footballers
Cienciano footballers
León de Huánuco footballers
Peruvian Primera División players
Peruvian Segunda División players